The Christian Council of Tanzania is a Christian ecumenical organization founded in Tanzania in 1964. It is a member of the World Council of Churches, the Fellowship of Christian Councils in Southern Africa and the Fellowship of Christian Councils and Churches in the Great Lakes and Horn of Africa.

External links 
 
World Council of Churches listing
CCT Morogoro Women Training Centre

Christian organizations established in 1964
Members of the World Council of Churches
Christian organizations based in Africa
Christianity in Tanzania
National councils of churches